Tableau (French for 'little table' literally, also used to mean 'picture';  tableaux or, rarely, tableaus) may refer to:

Arts
 Tableau, a series of four paintings by Piet Mondrian titled Tableau I through to Tableau IV
 Tableau vivant, a motionless performance evoking a painting or sculpture; or a painting or photograph evoking such a theatrical scene
 Scene (drama), in opera, ballet, and some other dramatic forms

Games 
 Tableau (card game), a specific patience card game
 Tableau (cards), the layout in patience and fishing card games
 Tableau (dominoes), the layout in dominoes

Other
 Tableau, another term for a table of data, particularly:
 Cryptographic tableau, or tabula recta, used in manual cipher systems
 Division tableau, a table used to do long division
 Method of analytic tableaux (also semantic tableau or truth tree), a technique of automated theorem proving in logic
 Tableau Software, a company providing tools for data visualization and business intelligence
 Young tableau, a combinatorial object built on partition diagrams
 Simplex tableau, a structured matrix used in the simplex algorithm

See also
 Table (disambiguation)
  or Economic Table, an economic model first described by French economist François Quesnay in 1758